Blue Dress or blue dress may refer to:

Clothing 
 Blue Dress uniform of the United States Marine Corps
 Army Service Uniform, blue military uniform worn by United States Army personnel
 Blue dress worn by Monika Lewinsky during the Clinton–Lewinsky scandal
 Engagement announcement dress of Catherine Middleton, worn in 2010
 Navy blue Guy Laroche dress of Hilary Swank, worn to the Academy Awards in 2005
 The dress, a 2015 viral internet sensation
 Alice in Wonderland dress, commonly depicted in blue

Songs 
 "Blue Dress", 1963 song by The Murmaids on the B-side of "Popsicles and Icicles"
 "Blue Dress", 1990 song by Depeche Mode on Violator
 "Blue Dress", 2003 song by The Number Twelve Looks Like You on Put on Your Rosy Red Glasses
 "Vestido Azul", 2003 song by La Oreja de Van Gogh on Lo Que te Conté Mientras te Hacías la Dormida
 "Blue Dress", 2006 recording by Mike Doughty on The Lo-Fi Lodge
 "Blue Dress", 2010 song by Walk the Moon on I Want! I Want!
 "Blue Dress", 2010 song by Chomet from The Illusionist: Music from the Motion Picture
 "The Blue Dress", 2012 song by Wild Nothing on Nocturne
 "Sineye Plat'e", 2013 song by NikitA
 "Blue Dress", 2018 song by Gillian Hills
 "Blue Dress", 2019 song by Benjamin Francis Leftwich on Gratitude

Literature 
 The Blue Dress, 1991 young adult novel by Libby Hathorn
 The Blue Dress, 2003 poetry collection by Alison Townsend
 La Robe bleue, 2004 novel by Michèle Desbordes
 The Blue Dress, short story by Lynda Myles

Art 
 The Blue Dress, 1911 painting by Walter Westley Russell
 Blue Dress, 1990 sculpture by Karen LaMonte
 "The Man Who Sang and The Woman Who Kept Silent" (colloquially known as "The Blue Dress"), 1998 artwork by Judith Mason

Other 
 "Blue Dress", 1985 G&L guitar used by Jerry Cantrell
 "The Blue Dress", 2006 episode of Young American Bodies
 Blue Dress Park, urban space in Milwaukee, Wisconsin

See also